Isidore of Kiev, also known as Isidore of Thessalonica or Isidore, the Apostate (1385 – 27 April 1463), was a prelate of Byzantine Greek origin. From 1437 to 1441 he served as the Metropolitan of Kiev and all Rus' in the patriarchate of Constantinople of the Eastern Orthodox Church. He was a supporter of the Union of Florence which he proclaimed in Hagia Sophia on 12 December 1452. In the Latin Church, Isidore was the cardinal bishop of Sabina, Archbishop of Cyprus, Camerlengo of the Sacred College of Cardinals and the Latin Patriarch of Constantinople.

Early life
Isidore was born in southern Greece circa 1385. He arrived at Constantinople, became a monk, and was there made hegumenos of the monastery of St Demetrius. He knew Latin well, and had considerable fame as a theologian. He was also an accomplished orator; he seems from the beginning to have been eager for reunion with the West.

It was the time when the Court of Constantinople, on the eve of its final destruction by the Turks, was considering the chance of rescue from the Western princes as a result of reuniting with Rome. In 1434 Isidore was sent to Basel by John VIII Palaiologos (1425–1448) as part of an embassy to open negotiations with the Council of Basel. Here he made a mellifluous speech about the splendour of the Roman Empire at Constantinople, but his efforts did not result in union of the churches.

Metropolitan of Kiev

In 1437, Isidore was appointed Metropolitan of Kiev and all Rus' by Emperor John VIII Palaeologus and consecrated by Patriarch Joseph II. The Emperor hoped to draw the Eastern Orthodox Church in Kievan Rus' into communion with the Holy See and thereby to secure Constantinople's protection against the invading Ottoman Turks. 

The Grand Duke of Moscow — Vasili II — was suspicious of the new metropolitan.  He allowed Isidore to go to Florence to attend the continuation of the Council of Basel in 1439 on condition that Isidore should return with "the rights of Divine law and the constitution of the holy Church" uninjured. Isidore assured him that he would return from the ecumenical council without betraying the Orthodox faith.  During this Council, Isidore fervently defended the union between the Churches of East and West, but he was opposed by the secular representative from Ruthenia - ambassador Foma (Thomas) of Tver. Finally, the union agreement was signed and Isidore returned to Eastern Europe. Sylvester Syropoulos and other Greek writers charge Isidore with perjury because he accepted the union, despite his promise to Vasili II.

Council of Ferrara
It is possible that Isidore had been a pupil of the neoplatonist Gemistus Pletho, and went with his teacher and two of Pletho's other students, Bessarion and Mark Eugenikos, to attend the Council of Ferrara, which was intended to negotiate the reunion of the Orthodox and Catholic Churches.

The large delegation of theologians and philosophers set out with a great following on 8 September 1437, travelled via Riga and Lübeck, and arrived at Ferrara on 15, August, 1438. On the way, he caused offense by his friendly conduct towards the Latins. At Ferrara and at Florence, where the council moved to in January, 1439, Isidore was one of the six chief speakers on the Byzantine side. Together with Bessarion he steadfastly worked for the union, and never swerved afterwards in his acceptance of it.

After the council, Pope Eugene IV made him his legate for all Ruthenia and Lithuania. While returning to Moscow, news reached Isidore, at Benevento, that he had been made Cardinal-Priest of the Title of St Peter and Marcellinus. This was one of the few cases at the time in which a person not of the Latin Rite was made a cardinal.

From Buda, in March 1440, he published an encyclical calling on all Rus' bishops to accept the union, but when he at last arrived in Moscow (Easter, 1441), and proclaimed the union in the Kremlin church, he found that Vasily II and most of the bishops and people would have none of it. Then, at Vasily's command, six Rus' bishops met in a synod, deposed Isidore, and imprisoned him.

The Grand Duchy of Moscow princes denounced the union with Rome, but Isidore persisted. On his return from Italy, during his first Pontifical Divine Liturgy in the Dormition Cathedral in the Moscow Kremlin, Isidore had a Latin Rite crucifix carried in front of the procession and named Pope Eugene IV during the prayers of the liturgy. He also read aloud the decree of unification. Isidore passed a message to Vasili II from the Holy See, containing a request to assist the Metropolitan in spreading the Union in Rus'. Three days later, Isidore was arrested by the Grand Prince and imprisoned in the Chudov Monastery. He was denounced by certain Rus' clergymen, who were under pressure of Vasili II, for refusing to renounce the union with Rome.

Exile
In September 1443, after two years of imprisonment, Metropolitan Isidor escaped to Tver, then to Lithuania and on to Rome. He was graciously received by the pope in 1443. Pope Nicholas V (1447–1455) sent him as legate to Constantinople to arrange the reunion there in 1452, and gave him two hundred soldiers to help the defence of the city. On 12 December of that year he was able to unite three hundred of the Byzantine clergy in a celebration of the short-lived reunion.

Before the Fall of Constantinople in 1453, he subsidized the repair of fortifications at his own expense and was wounded in the early hours of the sack. He managed to escape the carnage by dressing up a dead body in his cardinal's robes.  While the Turks were cutting off its head and parading it through the streets, the real cardinal was shipped off to Asia Minor with a number of insignificant prisoners, as a slave and later found safety in Crete. He composed a series of letters describing the events of the siege. He warned of the danger of further expansion of the Turks in the multiple letters and even seems to be the earliest eyewitness to have compared Mehmed II with Alexander the Great.

He made his way back to Rome in 1455, and was made Bishop of Sabina, presumably adopting the Latin Rite. Pope Pius II (1458–64) later gave him two titles successively, those of Latin Patriarch of Constantinople and Archbishop of Cyprus, neither of which he could convert into real jurisdiction. He was Dean of the Sacred College of Cardinals from October 1461 until his death in 1463.

In popular media 
Cardinal Isidore is portrayed by İzzet Çivril in the 2012 film Fetih 1453. In the film, the Cardinal is depicted as a prisoner after the fall of Constantinople.

He is played by Lex Gigeroff in the 2006 film The Conclave.

See also
Metropolis of Kiev, Galicia and all Rus' (1441 - 1596)
Greek scholars in the Renaissance

Notes

References

Further reading
Histories of the Council of Florence describe the adventures of Cardinal Isidore.
Sergey F. Dezhnyuk, "Council of Florence: The Unrealized Union", 2017.
Ludwig Pastor, Geschichte der Paepste, I (3rd and 4th ed., Freiburg im Br., 1901), 585, etc., and his references.
The Monumenta Hungariae historica, XXI, 1, contain two versions of the letter to Nicholas V (pp. 665–95, 696–702); see Krumbacher, Byzantinische Litteraturgeschichte (Munich, 1897), 311
Strahl, Geschichte der russischen Kirche, I (Halle, 1830), 444
Frommann, Kritische Beitraege zur Geschichte der Florentiner Kircheneinigung (Halle, 1872), 138 seq.
Hefele, Conciliengeschichte, VII (Freiburg im Br., 1886), passim.
Silvano, Luigi, "Per l'epistolario di Isidoro di Kiev: la lettera a papa Niccolò V del 6 luglio 1453", Medioevo Greco 13 (2013), 223–240 (edition of a letter to Pope Nicholas V)
Silvano, Luigi, "Per l'epistolario di Isidoro di Kiev (II): la lettera al Doge Francesco Foscari dell'8 luglio 1453", Orientalia Christiana Periodica 84.1 (2018), 99–132 (edition of a letter to Doge Francesco Foscari).

External links
Source
Исидор (митрополит) in online Russian Biographical Dictionary (in Russian)

1385 births
1463 deaths
15th-century Byzantine military personnel
Deans of the College of Cardinals
Converts to Eastern Catholicism from Eastern Orthodoxy
Metropolitans of Kiev and all Rus' (988–1441)
Greek Eastern Catholics
Former Greek Orthodox Christians
Greek cardinals
Greek expatriates in Russia
Cardinal-bishops of Sabina
Diplomats of the Holy See
14th-century Byzantine people
15th-century Byzantine people
People from the Peloponnese
Latin Patriarchs of Constantinople
Fall of Constantinople